Edward Dudley was an American Negro league pitcher in the 1920s. 

Dudley attended Bishop College in Marshall, Texas. He made his Negro league debut in 1926 with the Lincoln Giants and played for the club again in 1927. In 1932, Dudley played for the Newark Browns.

References

External links
 and Seamheads 

Year of birth missing
Year of death missing
Place of birth missing
Place of death missing
Lincoln Giants players
Newark Browns players
Baseball pitchers